Gongylis is a genus of flowering plants belonging to the family Brassicaceae.

Its native range is Peru.

Species:
 Gongylis peruviana (Al-Shehbaz, Ed.Navarro & A.Cano) Sánchez Och. & Molinari

References

Brassicaceae
Brassicaceae genera